The Filipino Society of Cinematographer (FSC) is an educational, cultural, and professional organization of cinematographers established on February 27, 1970.

In 2010, the FSC in cooperation with the National Commission for Culture and the Arts of the Philippines held the first Advance HD Cinematography and Digital Filmmaking Workshop in Batangas.

External links
Filipino Society of Cinematographers holds first digital film workshop

Entertainment industry societies
Cinematography organizations
Film organizations in the Philippines
Organizations based in Metro Manila
Arts organizations established in 1970
1970 establishments in the Philippines